The Sunraysia-Riverlands Rugby League is a rugby league football competition in Victoria, Australia held by NRL Victoria. The league was formed in 1991 representing 5 clubs in the far south-west corner of New South Wales, along with 1 club from Victoria. During its first 4 seasons, the league was overseen by both the Country Rugby League & Victorian Rugby League, before the competition was disbanded in 1995.

The league was reformed in 2011 with five clubs, however as of 2022, this has been reduced to 2 clubs both located in Victoria. As both clubs remaining are from Victoria, sole control of the league passed to NRL Victoria. This changed however when the league entered a temporary amalgamation with the NSWRL's Outback Rugby League for 2022 due to a lack of numbers, with joint control returning once more.

Clubs

Clubs From Outback Rugby League playing in Sunraysia Competition 2022 
Due to a lack of club numbers in both competitions, the following clubs have joined the Sunraysia-Riverlands RL in 2022:

Former Clubs

Champions
This is a list of the Sunraysia-Riverlands Rugby League 1st Grade competition champions and the runners-up for each of the 5 Seasons the competition existed. There was also other competitions which existed below the 1st Grade competition such as the Reserve Grade competition which operated a feeder-league to the 1st Grade competition.

See also

Rugby league in New South Wales

References

External links
Sunraysia-Riverland Rugby League Fox Sports pulse

Rugby league competitions in New South Wales
1991 establishments in Australia
Sports leagues established in 1991
Rugby league in Victoria (Australia)